Acrocercops vanula is a moth of the family Gracillariidae. It is known from India (Karnataka).

The larvae feed on Terminalia catappa, Terminalia paniculata and Terminalia tomentosa. They probably mine the leaves of their host plant.

References

vanula
Moths described in 1912
Moths of Asia